The following is List of Universities and Colleges in Tianjin.

Note: Institutions without full-time bachelor programs are not listed. And all lists are by English alphabet.

Others
Tianjin Crafts and Arts Professional College (天津工艺美术职业学院)
Tianjin Open University (天津大学广播电视大学)
The Florida International University Tianjin Center, opened in 2006 as a cooperative venture between the municipal government and the Miami-based university.
Raffles Design Institute Tianjin is a joint-project between Tianjin University of Commerce, Boustead College and Raffles Design Institute, Singapore.

References
List of Chinese Higher Education Institutions — Ministry of Education
List of Chinese universities, including official links
Tianjin Institutions Admitting International Students

 
Tianjin